Sumit Antil (born 6 July 1998) is an Indian paralympian and javelin thrower. He won a gold medal in men's javelin throw F64 category at the 2020 Summer Paralympics. He holds the current world record, having thrown 68.62 meters in the Indian Open National Para Athletics Championships.

Early life 
Sumit Antil was born on 6 July 1998 in Khewra, Sonipat, Haryana, India. Born in Antil clan of Jats. Young Sumit wanted to pursue a career in wrestling and join Indian Army. In 2015, when he was 17, his motorbike was hit by a speeding truck while he was returning home from training. As a result, his left leg was amputated and he had to abandon his dream of becoming a wrestler. Sumit is supported by the GoSports Foundation through the Para Champions Programme. After completing his secondary education in Dev Rishi Senior Secondary School, Sonipat, Antil was introduced to Para athletics by another para athlete, Rajkumar, while he was pursuing his B.Com from Ramjas college of Delhi University.

In 2017, Antil started training under Nitin Jaiswal in Delhi, and competed in various National and International platforms. He began competing at javelin on the National circuit and GoSports inducted him into the Para Champions Programme in 2019.

Career 
In 2019, at the World Para Athletics Grand Prix in Italy, he broke the world record in the F64 category en route to winning the Silver medal in the Combined Event. He then won the Silver medal at World Para Athletics Championships, Dubai, 2019 and in the process broke his own world record in the F64 category.

On 30 August 2021, Antil won a gold medal with a World Record throw of 68.55m in javelin throw F64 at 2020 Summer Paralympics. Competing in the Indian Open National Para Athletics Championships, Antil rewrote the world record for the fourth time in a year with a throw of 68.62 meters, breaking his own mark of 68.55 meters. Three of these marks were astonishingly set during the final of the Tokyo paralympics en route to winning gold.

Family 
Sumit Antil's family consists of his mother, Niramala Devi, and three sisters, Kiran, Sushila & Renu. His father, Ram Kumar, died when he was seven.

Awards 
 2021 – Khel Ratna Award, highest sporting honour of India.
 2022 – Padma Shri Award, fourth-highest civilian award of the Republic of India.

See also 
 Athletics in India
 India at the 2020 Summer Paralympics

References 

1998 births
Living people
Paralympic athletes of India
Indian male javelin throwers
People from Sonipat
Athletes from Haryana
Medalists at the 2020 Summer Paralympics
Paralympic gold medalists for India
Track and field athletes with disabilities
Paralympic medalists in athletics (track and field)
Athletes (track and field) at the 2020 Summer Paralympics
Recipients of the Khel Ratna Award
Ramjas College alumni
Recipients of the Padma Shri in sports